Årnes is a village in Nes municipality in Viken County (Akershus County until January 1st 2020), Norway. The village is located along the eastern riverbank of the Glomma River, roughly 3 kilometers downriver from its confluence with the Vorma River.

History
Prior to 1862, the area consisted of farmland and a few buildings. One fifth of the surrounding farmland and fields were expropriated for the establishment of Årnes Station and the Kongsvinger Railway Line, which opened on October 3rd 1862. The establishment of the railroad and station lead to Årnes making the change from a purely agricultural community to incorporating elements of commerce, such as a coaching inn, trading company and boating channel.

References

Villages in Akershus
Nes, Akershus